The .25 Winchester Super Short Magnum is a third member of the Winchester Super Short Magnum (WSSM) cartridge family created by Winchester and Browning. It is the largest caliber of the WSSM line (excluding wildcats) and is the most capable of handling large game such as deer and wild boar.

Description

It is a necked-up version of the .243 WSSM, which is in turn a shortened .300 WSM (Winchester Short Magnum). The WSSM cartridges are based on ballistics design philosophies that are intended to produce a high level of efficiency.

Like other WSSM cases, the .25 is short and fat, which is designed to be more efficient.

Unlike the other WSSM rounds, the .25 is a magnum in name only, based on the case it uses. Performance wise it is a clone of the .25-06 Remington, making it well suited for medium to large game. The 25 WSSM provides the same performance as the 25-06 Remington, with the advantage of having lighter short action rifles. Having the short fat design, the cartridge loads burn at a more consistent rate, providing a higher level of accuracy.  Performance is far less than other .25 caliber magnum rounds as the .257 Weatherby Magnum. In fact, ballistically it's almost identical to the improved version of the .257 Roberts, which P.O. Ackley said was his favorite choice for an all-around cartridge.

See also
 .223 WSSM
 .243 WSSM
 .257 Roberts
 .25-06 Remington
 Winchester Super Short Magnum
 Table of handgun and rifle cartridges
sectional density

References

External links
 The Experts Agree - The WSSMs are Winners! - Browning
 The Overlooked .25 Caliber Cartridges by Chuck Hawks

Pistol and rifle cartridges
Winchester Super Short Magnum rifle cartridges